Alfred Newton Richards (March 22, 1876 – March 24, 1966) was an American pharmacologist. Richards, along with Wearn, is credited with the method of renal micropuncture to study the functioning of kidneys in 1924.

Career
Richards was born in Stamford, New York the son of Rev. Leonard E. Richards and his wife, Mary Elizabeth Burbank. He was educated at the Stamford Seminary and Union Free School. He then studied at Yale University.

He served as chairman of the University of Pennsylvania School of Medicine's department of pharmacology from 1910 to 1946 and was the university's vice-president of medical affairs from 1939 to 1948.

In 1941 President Franklin Delano Roosevelt appointed Richards chairman of the Committee on Medical Research. After this office was terminated in 1946, Richards became president of the National Academy of Sciences, serving until 1950.

In 1948, President Harry Truman appointed Richards to the Medical Affairs Task Force of the Commission on the Organization of the Executive Branch of the Government; Richards also became a director of Merck & Co., for which he had consulted since 1931, and an associate trustee of the University of Pennsylvania in 1948.

Family

He married Lillian L. Woody in 1908.

Recognition

Richards' technique for the study of kidney functioning is considered a landmark in animal physiology research. The Richards Medical Research Laboratories building at the University of Pennsylvania , one of the best-known and most influential designs of architect Louis Kahn, is named for him.

Awards and honors
Abraham Flexner Award of the Association of American Medical Colleges
Gerhard Medal of the Pathological Society of Philadelphia
Kober Medal of the Association of American Physicians
John Scott Medal of the City of Philadelphia
Gold Medal of the New York Academy of Medicine
Keyes Medal of the Association of Genito-Urinary Surgeons
Philadelphia Bok Award
Procter Award of the Philadelphia Drug Exchange
Guggenheim Cup Award
Lasker Award
Kovalenko Medal of the National Academy of Sciences.
Foreign Fellow of the Royal Society of London
Honorary Fellow of the Royal Society of Edinburgh

In addition, Richards was awarded the following honorary degrees:
Doctor of Science
University of Pennsylvania
Western Reserve University
Yale University
Harvard University
Columbia University
Williams College
Princeton University
New York University
Doctor of Laws
University of Edinburgh
Johns Hopkins University
Doctor of Medicine
University of Pennsylvania
University of Louvain

References

1876 births
1966 deaths
University of Pennsylvania faculty
American pharmacologists
Foreign Members of the Royal Society
Members of the United States National Academy of Sciences
People from Stamford, New York
Scientists from New York (state)
Journal of Biological Chemistry editors